Vonteego Marfeek Cummings (born February 29, 1976) is an American professional basketball player who last played for Atenienses de Manatí of the Baloncesto Superior Nacional (BSN) in Puerto Rico. A  combo guard, he played in the National Basketball Association (NBA) and also had a successful career in Europe, where he played in several countries.

Professional career

NBA career
A first-round pick (26th overall) by the Indiana Pacers in 1999, Cummings was immediately traded for forward-center Jeff Foster to the Golden State Warriors, where he played for two seasons (1999–2001). As a rookie in the 1999–00 season, Cummings started 11 of 75 games played, averaging 9.4 points and 3.3 assists for 23.9 minutes a contest. In 2000–01, he averaged 7.3 points and 3.4 assists for 22.7 minutes in 66 games played (11 as a starter). Cummings was traded to the Philadelphia 76ers prior to the 2001–02 season, in which he averaged 3.3 points and 1 assist per game. In September 2002, Cummings signed as a free agent with the Cleveland Cavaliers, but was waived before the start of the season. In Cummings' three NBA seasons, he averaged 6.9 (1381 total) points and 2.7 assists, shooting .383 from the field in 199 games (23 starts).

European career
Cummings played with the Westchester Wildfire of the United States Basketball League (USBL) during the summer of 2003. He began his overseas career in Italy with Carisbo Castelmaggiore in the 2003–04 season. In summer 2004, he again played for the Westchester Wildfire. After that, he returned to Europe and signed with the Serbian team Hemofarm Vršac for the 2004–05 season. Cummings started the 2005–06 season with the Fort Worth Flyers of the NBA Development League (NBDL), but in February 2006 he returned to Serbia, and signed with Partizan Belgrade until the end of the season. However, he played there and in the 2006–07 season, having a great season especially in the Euroleague, averaging 12.9 points and 3.4 assists over 20 games. This performances secured him a move to Israeli powerhouse Maccabi Tel Aviv, on a two-year deal. However, he was released of the contract in the summer of 2008. His next step was with Estudiantes from Spain, but he stayed there until December when he was released. Until the end of the 2008–09 season, he was at his third stint in Serbia, this time with Vojvodina Srbijagas, and finished with Cedevita of Croatia. Cummings' next station was Greece, where he played the entire 2009–10 season for Ilysiakos. In the 2010–11 season, Cummings played for Keravnos in Cyprus. In October 2011, he signed with the Polish team Trefl Sopot, averaging around 3 points per game in the 2011–12 season.

BSN Puerto Rico
Cummings, signed a contract with the Atenienses de Manatí of the Baloncesto Superior Nacional (BSN) in Puerto Rico on January 21, 2015 making his comeback to professional basketball after a few years of inactivity. He was released by Atenienses on March 18, 2015 but stuck around with the club for a further three games pending the arrival of Dominique Jones.

Career statistics

NBA

Regular season

|-
| align="left" | 1999–00
| align="left" | Golden State
| 75 || 11 || 23.9 || .405 || .325 || .751 || 2.5 || 3.3 || 1.2 || .2 || 9.4
|-
| align="left" | 2000–01
| align="left" | Golden State
| 66 || 11 || 22.7 || .344 || .336 || .681 || 2.1 || 3.4 || 1.0 || .2 || 7.3
|-
| align="left" | 2001–02
| align="left" | Philadelphia
| 58 || 1 || 8.6 || .417 || .261 || .750 || .9 || 1.0 || .3 || .1 || 3.3
|- class="sortbottom"
| align="left" | Career
| align="left" |
| 199 || 23 || 19.0 || .383 || .321 || .726 || 1.9 || 2.7 || .9 || .2 || 6.9

Playoffs

|-
| align="left" | 2001–02
| align="left" | Philadelphia
| 1 || 0 || 1.0 || .000 || .000 || .000 || .0 || .0 || .0 || .0 || .0

Euroleague

|-
| align="left" | 2005–06
| align="left" | Partizan
| 1 || 1 || 30.3 || .100 || .333 || .000 || 2.0 || 7.0 || 3.0 || .0 || 3.0 || 4.0
|-
| align="left" | 2006–07
| align="left" | Partizan
| 20 || 20 || 34.1 || .408 || .380 || .852 || 2.6 || 3.4 || 1.6 || .2 || 12.9 || 11.4
|-
| align="left" | 2007–08
| align="left" | Maccabi
| 24 || 23 || 18.1 || .383 || .260 || .792 || 1.0 || 2.5 || .8 || .1 || 5.4 || 3.7
|- class="sortbottom"
| align="left" | Career
| align="left" |
| 45 || 44 || 26.1 || .389 || .333 || .838 || 1.7 || 3.0 || 1.2 || .1 || 6.9 || 7.3

References

External links
 Vonteego Cummings at NBA.com
 Vonteego Cummings at Basketball-Reference.com
 Vonteego Cummings at Euroleague.net
 Vonteego Cummings at ACB.com
 Vonteego Cummings at ESAKE.gr

1976 births
Living people
ABA League players
African-American basketball players
American expatriate basketball people in Croatia
American expatriate basketball people in Cyprus
American expatriate basketball people in Greece
American expatriate basketball people in Israel
American expatriate basketball people in Italy
American expatriate basketball people in Poland
American expatriate basketball people in Serbia
American expatriate basketball people in Spain
American men's basketball players
Basketball players from Georgia (U.S. state)
CB Estudiantes players
Fort Worth Flyers players
Golden State Warriors players
Ilysiakos B.C. players
Indiana Pacers draft picks
Israeli Basketball Premier League players
Keravnos B.C. players
KK Cedevita players
KK Hemofarm players
KK Partizan players
KK Vojvodina Srbijagas players
KK Zagreb players
Liga ACB players
Maccabi Tel Aviv B.C. players
People from Thomson, Georgia
Philadelphia 76ers players
Pittsburgh Panthers men's basketball players
Point guards
Shooting guards
Trefl Sopot players
21st-century African-American sportspeople
20th-century African-American sportspeople